Alton is a town within the locality of St George in the Shire of Balonne, Queensland, Australia. As at 2018, it is completely covered in bushland and there are no buildings or evidence of the roads shown on the town map.

Geography 
Alton is located to the south of the Moonie River and north of the Moonie Highway. The Alton National Park is to the south-east of the town.

History 
Alton first appears on an 1883 survey plan. In January 1885, the Queensland Government gazetted a camping reserve to the west of the town.

As at October 2018, there is no evidence that any development occurred in the town.

References

External links 
 Town map of Alton, 1977

Towns in Queensland
Shire of Balonne